Gobiopsis woodsi, Woods' barbelgoby, is a species of goby found in the Indo-west Pacific.

Size

Etymology
The fish is named in honor of Loren P. Woods (1914–1979), the Curator of Fishes, at the Field Museum of Natural History in Chicago, it was he who collected all but two of the known specimens at the time.

References

Gobiidae
Taxa named by Ernest A. Lachner
Taxa named by James F. McKinney
Fish described in 1978